This is a season-by-season list of records compiled by Canisius in men's ice hockey.

Canisius College has made one appearance in the NCAA Tournament, losing its only game in 2013.

Season-by-season results

Note: GP = Games played, W = Wins, L = Losses, T = Ties

† Brian Cavanaugh was fired in December of 2004.

Footnotes

References

 
Lists of college men's ice hockey seasons in the United States
Canisius Golden Griffins ice hockey seasons